Andrew Paul Rumsey (born 1968) is a British Anglican bishop. Since January 2019, he has served as the Bishop of Ramsbury in the Church of England.

Early life an education
Rumsey was born in 1968. He was educated at the University of Reading (BA History 1989), Ridley Hall, Cambridge (MA, 1998) and King's College London (DThMin, 2016).

Ordained ministry
Rumsey was ordained in the Church of England: made deacon at Petertide 1997 (26 June) by Richard Chartres, Bishop of London, at St Paul's Cathedral; and ordained priest the Petertide following (5 July 1998), by Graham Dow, Bishop of Willesden, at St Martin's Church, Ruislip. From 2011 to 2018, he was Rector of St Mary's Church, Oxted in the Diocese of Southwark.

In October 2018, he was announced as the next Bishop of Ramsbury, a suffragan bishop in the Diocese of Salisbury. On 25 January 2019, he was consecrated a bishop by Justin Welby, Archbishop of Canterbury, during a service at Southwark Cathedral. He was welcomed into the diocese as the 17th Bishop of Ramsbury during Evensong at Salisbury Cathedral on 26 January 2019.

Rumsey has created several series of short video reflections on the theology of place, entitled Going to Ground, which are available on YouTube. The first series began in March 2020, at a time of national lockdown due to the COVID-19 epidemic.  Many of the videos are recorded on the grounds of church buildings in and around Wiltshire, while others are recorded in the natural rural environment.

In an interview following his consecration as Bishop of Ramsbury, Rumsey stated that Evensong is his favourite form of church service.

Rumsey has written several books, most recently English Grounds in 2021, published by SCM Press.

References

1968 births
Living people
Alumni of the University of Reading
Alumni of Ridley Hall, Cambridge
Alumni of King's College London
20th-century English Anglican priests
21st-century English Anglican priests
Bishops of Ramsbury